Glen Coghlan (born 29 July 1974) is a former Australian rules footballer who played with St Kilda in the Australian Football League (AFL).

Coghlan was on the supplementary list at Collingwood and played for both Waaia (Nathalia Football Club) and Kyabram, before arriving at St Kilda, via the 1995 Pre-Season Draft. He played initially as a centre half-forward, but was then used as a defender. Over the course of three seasons, Coghlan amassed 29 league games.

References

External links
 
 

1974 births
Australian rules footballers from Victoria (Australia)
St Kilda Football Club players
Kyabram Football Club players
Living people